Hiroshi Kawaguchi may refer to:

 Hiroshi Kawaguchi (actor), Japanese actor
 Hiroshi Kawaguchi (composer), Japanese composer